Joseph Devonsher Jackson PC (23 June 1783 – 19 December 1857) was an Irish Conservative MP in the United Kingdom Parliament and subsequently a High Court Judge.

Early career 

He was the eldest son of Strettell Jackson of Peterborough, County Cork, a carrier by trade, and Mary Cossens. He went to a private school run by a local clergyman. He attended Trinity College Dublin, where he received the top honours every year, and attended the Middle Temple, before being called to the Irish Bar in 1806. He built up a lucrative legal practice, and was able to pay off his father's debts when the family business failed. He was briefly involved in the linen manufacturing business run by his wife's brother Mr. Clarke, but he had little talent for the trade. As a young man, he was a passionate and evangelical Protestant, active in attempting to convert Roman Catholics to his own faith; but as a judge, he was notably free of religious bias, despite the Queen's fears that he would prove to be a bigoted Orangeman.

Politician and judge 

He was appointed the King's Second Serjeant for Ireland in 1835, and remained the Queen's Second Serjeant until 1841, although ironically his continuance in the office was against the expressed wishes of Queen Victoria, who was concerned about his strong Protestant religious beliefs. He held the office of Chairman of County Londonderry Quarter Sessions, which he resigned to seek election to Parliament.

He was MP for Bandon from 1835–1841. He was a member of the Commons Select Committee on Banking in 1840. On 10 November 1841 he was appointed Solicitor-General for Ireland. The Government greatly relied on his advice concerning Irish affairs. He was also made a member of the Privy Council of Ireland. This preferment had the effect of vacating his Parliamentary seat.

Instead of seeking re-election in Bandon, Jackson stood for Dublin University. He represented that seat between 11 February 1842 and 9 September 1842. He was then appointed a Judge of the Court of Common Pleas (Ireland) 1842–1848. He resigned his Parliamentary seat by accepting the Chiltern Hundreds, so he could take up the judicial post. As a judge, he was noted for compassion in criminal cases.

Personal life

Jackson was described as a "temperate" politician, but he was a reliable supporter of the Protestant monarchy, constitution and church as well as the Union between Great Britain and Ireland, and a staunch opponent of Daniel O'Connell (who nicknamed him "Leather Lungs", due to his almost interminable speeches). He lived at Sutton Castle, Howth, north of Dublin city, and also had an estate at Knockalisheen, County Cork, which was the subject of litigation after his death.

He married in 1811 Sarah Lucinda Clarke, ninth daughter of Benjamin Clarke of Cullenswood, County Dublin and Mary Read, but the couple had no children. His widow died on 30 November 1858. On his death, his estate was divided between his four sisters.

He is buried at St. Fintan's Cemetery, Sutton.

References
Ball, F. Elrington  The Judges in Ireland 1221-1921 London John Murray 1926
Bell, G.M. "The Currency Question: an Examination of the Evidence on Banks of  Issue" London   Longman  Orme  Brown Green Longmans 1841
Geoghegan, Patrick M. "Jackson,   Joseph  Devonsher" Cambridge Dictionary of Irish Biography 
Smyth, Constantine Joseph "Chronicle of the Law Officers of Ireland" London  Butterworth 1839
 Who's Who of British Members of Parliament: Vol. I 1832-1885, edited by Michael Stenton (The Harvester Press 1976)

Notes

External links
 
 Portrait of Jackson in the British Museum

1783 births
1857 deaths
Alumni of Trinity College Dublin
Members of the Parliament of the United Kingdom for County Cork constituencies (1801–1922)
Irish Conservative Party MPs
Members of the Privy Council of Ireland
UK MPs 1835–1837
UK MPs 1837–1841
UK MPs 1841–1847
Solicitors-General for Ireland
Members of the Parliament of the United Kingdom for Dublin University
Serjeants-at-law (Ireland)
Burials at St. Fintan's Cemetery, Sutton